Bengt Oscarius (born 4 September 1944) is a Swedish curler.

In 1973 he was inducted into the Swedish Curling Hall of Fame.

Teams

Personal life
Bengt's older brother Kjell is also a curler and teammate.

References

External links
 

 The Giant Feat in Canada, the Greateast Moment for the 60th Anniversary of Djursholms Curling Club 

Living people
1944 births
Swedish male curlers
World curling champions
Swedish curling champions
20th-century Swedish people